San Jose del Monte station (also known as Altaraza station) is an under-preparation Manila Metro Rail Transit (MRT) station situated on Line 7. Located in San Jose del Monte, Bulacan, it is the northern terminus of the line.

The original location of the station would be located near the area of Colinas Verdes, a subdivision in San Jose del Monte. The area formally known as Ciudad Real is split between the  barangays Tungkong Mangga and San Manuel. In 2021, the project was realigned due to right-of-way issues, the site of the San Jose del Monte station was relocated on Barangay Tungkong Mangga.

The proposed terminus will be in the proposed "Super City" Real Estate Development which will be constructed by SM Prime Holdings and Palafox Associates. A , 6-lane asphalt road will also connect the station to the North Luzon Expressway.

References

External links
Proposed Araneta MRT Station 
Proposed Intermodal Real Estate Development 

Manila Metro Rail Transit System stations
Proposed railway stations in the Philippines